The Jacobsfriedhof, also known as the Jakobskirchhof ("St. James's Burial Ground" or "Churchyard"), is the oldest extant burial ground in Weimar, Thuringia, Germany, on land round the Jakobskirche (St. James's Church). The first burials took place here as early as the 12th century. The burial ground is located in the Jacobsvorstadt, which in the Middle Ages provided accommodation outside the city walls for pilgrims on their way to  Santiago de Compostela (and today forms part of the historic Old Town under UNESCO protection).

From 1530 to 1818 it was the only burial ground in Weimar. After 1818, when the "Neue Friedhof vor dem Frauentore" ("New Burial Ground before the Gate of Our Lady") was opened, now known as the Historical Cemetery, Weimar, many of the graves in the Jacobsfriedhof were levelled. From 1840 no more burials took place here, and the burial ground fell slowly into disrepair. Later the Weimar municipal authorities took it over and converted the burial ground into gardens. The Jacobsfriedhof today is part of the Klassik Stiftung Weimar.

The Kassengewölbe 

On the south-eastern edge of the Jacobfriedhof stands the mausoleum known as the Kassengewölbe, originally built in 1715 by a finance official as a private place of burial for himself and his family. In 1742 it became the property of the finance ministry or state exchequer, in German the Landeskasse, whence its present name Kassengewölbe: "exchequer vault". Since then it has principally served for the burials of people of high rank without the financial means for burials appropriate to their status. Such burials took place here from 1755 to 5 March 1823, including those of Luise von Göchhausen (a lady-in-waiting of Anna Amalia von Sachsen-Weimar-Eisenach) and the parents of Charlotte von Stein.

The present Baroque pavilion, formerly with a wrought-iron gate, that stands over the Kassengewölbe, is a reconstruction of 1913, as the original was levelled, with much of the burial ground, in 1854.

The Schiller Vault 

Because of his title of Hofrat and his elevation into the aristocracy in 1802, Friedrich von Schiller, who died on 9 May 1805, was among those whose remains were buried in the Kassengewölbe. The mausoleum is thus often referred to as the "Schiller Vault" (Schiller-Gruft). After 1826 the Bürgermeister of Weimar, Carl Leberecht Schwabe, had had Schiller's remains retrieved from the Kassengewölbe. The exhumed bones believed to be the poet's were transferred in 1827 to an oak coffin in the newly built Fürstengruft in the Historical Burial Ground. In 2008 a DNA analysis, which attracted much attention, showed that the bones in the coffin could not have been those of Schiller, and since then the coffin, next to that of Goethe, has stood empty. It is generally presumed that Schiller's real remains were lost when the Kassengewölbe and the burial ground were levelled, although there are many other theories.

Notable graves

Sources 
 Hannelore Henze, Doris-Annette Schmidt: Der Jacobskirchhof in Weimar. Königswinter 1998

External links 

Klassik-Stiftung.de: Kassengewölbe 

Cemeteries in Weimar